Hewar ( "Dialogue") is a jazz fusion band from Syria, formed in 2003.

Discography

 Hewar  (2005).
 9 Days of Solitude: The Damascus Session (2007), featuring Manfred Leuchter, accordion
 Letters to a Homeland  (2012), featuring Jivan Gasparyan, Rony Barrak, Morgenland Chamber Orchestra

References

External links
Hewar on discogs
Hewar on Dima Orsho's webpage

Syrian musical groups
Jazz fusion ensembles
Musical groups established in 2003
Syrian musicians